Overton is a small village and civil parish in the Hambleton district of North Yorkshire, England, about  north-west of York. The population of civil parish taken at the 2011 Census was less than 100. Details are included in the civil parish of Shipton, North Yorkshire.  The East Coast Main Line passes to the east, not far from the village.

History

The village is mentioned three times in the Domesday Book as Ovretun in the Bulford hundred. The manor belonged to Earl Morcar, who had a hall in the village, at the time of the Norman invasion. Some of the land was the possession of the Church of St Peter in York and of Thorbiorn. The manor passed to the Crown and Count Alan of Brittany by 1086. Both granted the manor to St Mary's Abbey, York. The Hall that once stood in the village was the country seat of the Abbots until the dissolution. The Hall was demolished at some time in the 18th century, though earthworks indicate where the old moat may have been. Eventually the manor and estate came into the hands of the Bourchier, and thence the Dawnay, family at Beningbrough. The parish was once much larger and included the manors of Shipton and Skelton. The remains of the base of a limestone cross indicate that there may have been a church in the village at one time.

Geography

The nearest settlements are Skelton  to the east; Nether Poppleton  to the south across the River Ouse; Beningbrough  to the north-west and Shipton  to the north. It lies on the north bank of the River Ouse.

In 1881 the UK Census recorded the population as 67.

Governance

The village lies within the Thirsk and Malton Parliamentary constituency. It also lies within the Shipton ward of Hambleton District Council and the Stillington electoral division of North Yorkshire County Council.

References

External links

Villages in North Yorkshire
Civil parishes in North Yorkshire